The 1982 Avon Championships of Los Angeles was a women's tennis tournament played on indoor carpet courts at the Forum in Los Angeles, California in the United States that was part of the 1982 Avon Championships circuit. It was the ninth edition of the tournament and was held from March 1 through March 7, 1982. Fifth-seeded Mima Jaušovec won the singles title, and earned $30,000 first-prize money.

Finals

Singles
 Mima Jaušovec defeated  Sylvia Hanika 6–2, 7–6(7–4)
 It was Jaušovec's 1st singles title of the year and the 5th, and last, of her career.

Doubles
 Kathy Jordan /  Anne Smith defeated  Barbara Potter /  Sharon Walsh 6–3, 7–5

Prize money

References

External links
 International Tennis Federation (ITF) tournament edition details

Avon Championships of Los Angeles
LA Women's Tennis Championships
Avon Championships of Los Angeles
Avon Championships of Los Angeles
Avon Championships of Los Angeles
Avon Championships of Los Angeles